WKBU (95.7 FM, "Bayou 95.7") is a radio station licensed to New Orleans. Owned by Audacy, Inc., it broadcasts a classic rock format. It shares studios with its sister stations at  400 Poydras Tower in downtown New Orleans, and the transmitter site is in the city's Algiers district.

The station broadcasts in HD Radio; its second subchannel formerly carried Metal Militia—a heavy metal-based format which changed its name in 2018 from The Metal Channel. The subchannel previously carried Live Rock.

History
WTKL was at one time beautiful music WBYU (called Bayou 96) before going through a succession of ill-fated formats from country as WQXY (Y-96) from 1987 to 1990 and adult contemporary as WMXZ (Mix 95.7) from 1990 to 1993.

1993-2005: Oldies 
In 1993, the station finally found suceess with an oldies format known as Kool 95.7 FM.

2005-present: Classic rock 
Due to flood damage to its transmitter in the aftermath of Hurricane Katrina, WKBU and WTKL switched frequencies in early-October 2005. At this time, the station became WKBU "Bayou 95-7" with a classic rock format. 

September 5, 2019, nationally syndicated John Clay Wolfe Show joins WKBU on Saturday mornings.

References

External links

WKBU
Classic rock radio stations in the United States
Radio stations established in 1953
Audacy, Inc. radio stations